Leyton is a town in east London, England, within the London Borough of Waltham Forest. It borders Walthamstow to the north, Leytonstone to the east, and Stratford to the south, with Clapton, Hackney Wick and Homerton, across the River Lea, to the west. The area includes New Spitalfields Market, Leyton Orient Football Club, as well as part of the Queen Elizabeth Olympic Park. The town consists largely of terraced houses built between 1870 and 1910, interspersed with some modern housing estates.
	
It was historically part of the ancient parish of Leyton St Mary in the Becontree hundred and part of the ancient county of Essex. The town expanded rapidly in the late 19th century, forming part of the conurbation of London and becoming a suburb, similar to much of south-west Essex. It became part of the Metropolitan Police District in 1839 and has been part of the London postal district since its inception in 1856. The parish became an urban district in 1894 and gained municipal borough status in 1926. In 1965, it merged with the neighbouring municipal boroughs of Walthamstow and Chingford to form the London Borough of Waltham Forest, a local government district of Greater London.

The town has become one of the most ethnically diverse areas in England, with 69 percent of residents belonging to a non-British ethnic background. Once a traditional, working class area, it is undergoing large-scale regeneration and gentrification, with large numbers of young professionals moving into the area.

History
Paleolithic implements and fossil bones show that early man hunted in Leyton. A Roman cemetery and the foundations of a Roman villa have been found here. From Anglo-Saxon times, Leyton has been part of the County of Essex. The name means "settlement (tun) on the River Lea" and was also known until 1921 as "Low Leyton". In the Domesday Book, the name is rendered as Leintun. at which time the population was 43.

The ancient parish church of St Mary the Virgin was largely rebuilt in the 17th century. The parish of Leyton also included Leytonstone. The old civil parish was formed into an Urban District within Essex in 1894 and it gained the status of Municipal Borough in 1926. The parish and urban district were officially known as Low Leyton until 1921. In 1965, the Municipal Borough of Leyton was abolished and was combined with that of Walthamstow and Chingford to form the London Borough of Waltham Forest, within the new county of Greater London. Although Leyton did not become officially part of London until 1965, the borough formed part of London's built-up area and had been part of the London postal district since its inception in 1856 and the Metropolitan Police District since 1839.

The main route through the town is the High Road, which forms part of the ancient route to Waltham Abbey. At the top end of the High Road is a crossroads with Lea Bridge Road and Hoe Street. This junction and the surrounding district is known as Bakers Arms, named after the public house which has now closed down. The pub was named in honour of the almshouses on Lea Bridge Road built in 1857 by the London Master Bakers' Benevolent Institution.

During the 17th and 18th centuries, Leyton was a "pretty retiring place from London" for wealthy merchants and bankers; in 1766 there were said to be 50 or 60 gentlemen with houses in the parish. Leyton's development from an agricultural community to an industrial and residential suburb was given impetus by the arrival of the railway. First at Lea Bridge Station in 1840, then at Low Leyton in 1856 (now Leyton Underground). Finally Leyton Midland Road opened in 1894, after an elevated line had been built on brick arches across the already developed streets. However, not all the green spaces were lost,  of Epping Forest within Leyton's borders were preserved by the Epping Forest Act 1878. In 1897 Leyton Urban District Council purchased the land for a formal park close to the town hall; it opened in 1903 as Coronation Gardens, named after the  coronation of King Edward VII. In 1905, the "Lammas land", common pasture land on Leyton Marshes, was purchased by the council for use as a recreation ground.

In World War I, about 1,300 houses were damaged by Zeppelin raids. By the 1920s, it had become a built-up and thriving urban industrial area known for manufacturing neckties and for its Thermos factory. During the Blitz of World War II, Leyton suffered as a target because of its proximity to the London Docks and Temple Mills rail yard. The yard (named after an ancient mill owned by the Knights Templar) is now reduced in size as part of it has become a retail park 'Leyton Mills', whilst the rest has been renovated to serve as a depot for high-speed Eurostar trains.

After World War Two, Leyton suffered from large-scale industrial decline in the second half of the 20th century. But, like much of east London, Leyton, which also borders the Queen Elizabeth Olympic Park, has benefited from significant regeneration projects over the past decade. Parks have been spruced up, some new small parks and gardens created and several tower blocks have been demolished. The millennium was marked with a clock tower in the Lea Bridge Rd area and a major piece of street art at Baker's Arms. And, most recently, in the build-up to the Olympics, Waltham Forest Borough Council spent £475,000 restoring 41 shopfronts on the part of Leyton High Road closest to the 2012 London Olympic Games site. The Olympics authority also funded the smartening up of pavements and street furniture.

Geography
Leyton is in the Lower Lea Valley, the river forming its western boundary. The area rises from low-lying marshland along the river Lea to over 90 feet at Whipps Cross on the southern edge of Epping Forest. Leyton is partially bisected by the A12 (M11 link road, built in the 1990s), with most of the district lying on the north-west side of this busy traffic artery through east London.

The High Road Leyton bridge crossing the A12 offers some of the best views in London of the Olympic Park, which also borders the district, as well as of skyscrapers further west. It borders Walthamstow along Lea Bridge Road and areas of the London Borough of Hackney via the River Lea.

Areas of Leyton

Bakers Arms
Leyton
Lea Bridge
Grove Green
Temple Mills

Demography

Leyton, which comprises three electoral wards with a total population of 42,061, is a diverse district. Between 61 and 69 per cent of its residents are either Black, Asian, or from an ethnic minority, according to the London Borough of Waltham Forest  profile reports for the Leyton (ward), Grove Green and Lea Bridge (ward) wards. This compares to 55.1% in the Borough as a whole, according to the 2011 United Kingdom census. Within these groups, there are many people whose origins are from Russia, North Africa, Ghana, Nigeria, Jamaica, Ireland, Portugal, Cyprus, and Italy as well as newer arrivals from South Africa, Bosnia, Serbia, and Poland. Moreover, more than half the population is under the age of 30, according to the most recent census. It is also highly multi-cultural, with just 34% of the population recorded as White British, the lowest indigenous British proportion in Waltham Forest.

Once a more traditional, working class district, it has become much more gentrified and expensive in recent years. A number of articles have referenced the large numbers of young professionals and other university-educated people moving into Leyton, and its subsequent gentrification and location as a current 'hot spot' to buy in. The area was referenced in the July 2015 edition of Vogue (magazine), which said: "All eyes are on Leyton and Stratford [right now]."  More widely in Waltham Forest, the borough has seen an influx of those who cannot afford higher house prices or rent in neighbouring Hackney as well as areas such as Bethnal Green and Bow in the nearby London Borough of Tower Hamlets. Related to this, Waltham Forest has been one of the fastest rising boroughs in terms of house prices since 2013.

Facilities
 The New Spitalfields Market, relocated in 1991 from the Old Spitalfields market, is the UK's leading horticultural market specialising in exotic fruit and vegetables.

There are two main shopping areas in the district, located at opposite ends of the High Road. There is a large retail park at Leyton Mills, next to the station. This has a large, 24-hour Asda store, a B&Q store and a selection of furniture and electrical stores. At the north end of the town, Baker's Arms has a more traditional selection of shops lining Lea Bridge Road and the High Road, including a branch of Tesco.

There are numerous pubs and bars situated on or near the High Road. These include the King William IV pub, home of Brodie's Brewery, a maker of craft beers and ales, the popular Antic-owned Leyton Technical pub, the Northcote Arms, the recently opened Leyton Star situated at the other side of Leyton station and the also recently opened Pepper's Ghost pub near to Leyton leisure centre. There are also several other drinking establishments on Lea Bridge Road. The newly built local police station is at Boreham Close near Leyton Midland Road station. It moved from Francis Road in December 2012.

Restaurants reflect the diversity of Leyton's population, with cuisines on offer including Turkish, Portuguese, Polish, Indian, Mauritian, Somali and Cypriot. There are also several fast-food takeaway shops, cafes and bakeries.

Leyton lies on the eastern side of the Hackney Marshes, one of the largest areas of open land in London. A bridge to the marshes crosses the Orient Way road and railway tracks from  Leyton Jubilee Park, which was created as a merger of two previously separate playing fields to mark the 60th anniversary of the reign of Queen Elizabeth II.

 A major focal point in the centre of Leyton is Coronation Gardens, a park built in 1902 to commemorate the coronation that year of King Edward VII. It includes a fountain, landscaped gardens, a bandstand and a children's maze.

On the High Road, near the site of the Bakers Arms, there is also a municipal gym and Leyton Leisure Centre swimming pool, which was formerly called the Leyton Leisure Lagoon and was reopened in October 2013 following a period of renovation.

There are two public libraries in Leyton. One on the High Road next door to the former Town Hall, and the other on Lea Bridge Road which has been recently modernised to offer extensive computer facilities.

The London Borough of Waltham Forest also operates Brooks Farm, a city farm in Skelton Lane Park, near Leyton Midland Road station. It is free to visitors and the livestock include pigs, sheep, cows, horses and llamas.

A recent regeneration of Ive Farm Fields in 2018 has brought a host of new facilities to the area, with floodlit sports pitches, a running track, volleyball courts and a series of walking routes. In memory of those who lost their lives in Waltham Forest during the Covid pandemic, a memorial plaque and tree has been placed in Jubilee Park as a tribute.

Housing

The majority of homes in the area consists of Victorian and Edwardian terraces built between 1870 and 1910 during Leyton's phase of rapid development from what had been a small village at the beginning of the 1800s. These properties range in size from two- to seven-bedroom houses. As a result, the area is popular with families.

Large-scale redevelopment and inner city regeneration has been underway in Leyton for many years, as is also the case in the neighbouring areas of Hackney, Bow, Clapton and Stratford. Leyton's skyline is comparatively low-rise compared to other districts of east London. High-rise estates once dominated the horizon, but the towers were unpopular with many residents and considered to be poorly constructed. The Oliver Close and Cathall Road estates were the first to be completely redeveloped by demolition and rebuilding with the help of the multimillion-pound Waltham Forest Housing Action Trust scheme during the early 2000s. The redevelopment of the problematic Avenue Road Estate followed. Demolition of the last large high-rise estate in the area, the Beaumont Road Estate, began in 2006. It has since been almost completely redeveloped. Indeed, the only remaining 20-storey tower block left in Waltham Forest – from a 1970s peak of 20 across the borough – is the Northwood Tower in Walthamstow. However, smaller 1960s-built blocks, such the 10-storey Slade Tower in the Leyton Grange estate, still dot the area. A host of modern apartment buildings have also been built since the late 1990s, notably the flats built at each end of Leyton Orient Football Club's Brisbane Road stadium. There is now further development taking place opposite Coronation Gardens and the Stadium with 750 new homes set to be built by 2027, known as The Score Centre.

Sports

The town is the home to the football club, Leyton Orient F.C., viewed by many residents as one of the most important parts of Leyton's identity. Orient came to Brisbane Road, Leyton in 1936 from Clapton. The stadium has over time been re-constructed and changed its name from Leyton Stadium to the Matchroom Stadium and is now the Breyer Group Stadium. Although they reached the top flight of English football when promoted to the Football League First Division in 1962, Orient currently play in League Two.

Leyton Orient's future in the heart of Leyton is uncertain. In October 2011, Orient submitted a request to the Football League to move into and become tenants of the London 2012 Olympic Stadium, following complaints over West Ham United being given a 99-year lease of the stadium. Orient claimed that the stadium was too close to their stadium, which they claimed would breach FA rules, and by extension, move the club into bankruptcy. There has also been talk of the club moving into the 15,000 seater Riverbank Arena.

Leyton F.C. (between 1975 and 1992 called "Leyton Wingate") was founded in 1868, and until January 2011 played in the Isthmian League Division One North at the Leyton Stadium in Lea Bridge Road. Leyton FC amalgamated with Walthamstow Pennant FC, in 1995 and renamed as Leyton Pennant FC. In 1994, they changed their name again to Waltham Forest FC.

Leyton also has a cricket pitch and pavilion, which was the former home of Essex County Cricket Club. In 1886, the club purchased Leyton Cricket Ground in the High Road, which became their headquarters until 1933; however, they continued to play at Leyton until 1977. The pavilion (a Grade II listed building) still stands today as part of Leyton Youth Centre.

The Lee Valley Ice Centre is home to the Lea Valley Lions Ice Hockey Club who play in the English National Ice Hockey League.

Leyton borders the Olympic Park for the 2012 Olympic Games. The training facilities at the Waltham Forest Pool & Track were used by Olympians to prepare for the Games.

Also in Leyton is the Lee Valley VeloPark, which has a 6,000-seat indoor velodrome for track cycling and a 6,000-seat outdoor BMX racing track. The Lee Valley Tennis and Hockey centres at Eton Manor are also due to open to the public in late 2013. The London Legacy Development Corporation claims this North Park area, the first section of the Olympic Park to reopen to the public after the 2012 Games, will "be a valuable area of open green space for the neighbouring communities" and "a place for jogging, kickabouts, children’s play and family picnics".

Education
Leyton has a number of secondary schools, including George Mitchell School, Lammas School and Norlington School. There is also a college, Leyton Sixth Form College, which is the second sixth form college in Southern England to get a licence, and the best college in London for sport.

Transport
Leyton is on the Central line of London Underground, with the station located at the southern end of the High Road. There is a London Overground station at Midland Road on the Gospel Oak to Barking line.

Leyton is served by routes 55, 56, 58, 69, 97, 158, 339, W14 and W15 and night bus routes N26 and N205.

Central London may be reached by bicycle from Lea Bridge Road following the London Cycle Network Route 9 through Hackney and Shoreditch.

Notable people

 Benik Afobe (born 1993) – Football player
 Peter Ashby – New wave musician and composer, born in Leyton 1963
 Joseph Gurney Barclay (1816–1898) – head of Barclays Bank and astronomer whose observatory was at Knotts Green House
 Harry Beck (1902–1974) – Creator of the London Underground Map
 William Bowyer (1699–1777) – Printer, buried in Leyton Parish Church
 Leyton Buzzards – Punk rock band of the late 1970s
 Jack Cornwell VC – Born in Leyton in 1900, killed at the Battle of Jutland in 1916
 William Cotton (1786–1866) – Banker, Governor of the Bank of England 1842–1845
 Bobby Crush (born 1954) – Pop pianist and actor
 Iron Maiden (1975) – Heavy Metal Band
 Hugo Dewar (1908–1981) – Trotskyist activist
 Curtis Davies (born 1985) – Football player
 Charles Goring, 2nd Earl of Norwich (1615–1671) – Soldier and aristocrat, lived at Forest House and buried in Leyton Parish Church
 Sir Gilbert Heathcote (1652–1733) – Governor of the Bank of England and Lord Mayor of London
 Gunshot – British hip hop group
 Sir Michael Hicks (1543–1612) – Courtier and politician, lord of the manor of Ruckholt
 Sir James Houblon (1629–1700) – Merchant and Member of Parliament (MP), lived at Forest House
 David Lewis (1682–1760) – Poet, buried in Leyton Parish Church
 John Lill – Musician (b.1944) CBE.  Winner of International Tchaikovsky Competition 1970.
 Thomas Lodge (1558–1625) – author, poet and playwright
 George Mitchell VC (1911–1944) – Soldier, killed in the Italian Campaign (World War II)
 Frank Muir (1920–1998) – Writer, television and radio personality
 John Henry Pepper (1821–1900) – Scientist and inventor, creator of Pepper's ghost, a famous stage illusion
 Sir Thomas Roe – English diplomat, born in Leyton in 1581
 John Strype (1643–1737) – Historian and biographer, was curate and vicar of Leyton 1669–1737
 Cardinal Nicholas Wiseman (1802–1865) – The first Archbishop of Westminster, lived at Etloe House, Leyton, 1858–1864

Filming locations

 Leyton Orient's Brisbane Road Stadium has also been used as a filming location: for parts of the 1995 football hooligan movie I.D.; for the 2008 terrorist drama Incendiary; and for the 1967 train heist thriller Robbery.
 Leyton Fire Station, on Church Road, was used as a filming location for exterior shots of the fictional Blackwall Fire Station in the ITV drama London's Burning, which aired between 1988 and 2002.

Sports clubs

 Leyton Football Club
 Leyton Orient Football Club
 Lee Valley Lions

References

External links

 Leyton.Info
 Waltham Forest Guardian (local newspaper)
 Council Tax for Leyton and Borough of Waltham Forest
 The Leyton War Memorial Project
Archives relating to Leytonstone at The National Archives (United Kingdom)
 Images of Leyton at the English Heritage Archive

 
Areas of London
Districts of the London Borough of Waltham Forest
District centres of London